Carabus exiguus exiguus is a black-coloured subspecies of ground beetle in the Carabinae subfamily that is endemic to Sichuan, China.

References

exiguus exiguus
Beetles described in 1898
Beetles of Asia
Endemic fauna of Sichuan
Taxa named by Andrey Semyonov-Tyan-Shansky